Amigo Alfred Junior Gomis (born 5 September 1993) is a Senegalese professional footballer who plays as a goalkeeper for Italian  club Como on loan from the French club Rennes, and the Senegal national team.

Early life
Born in Ziguinchor, Senegal, he moved in Cuneo, Italy with his family soon afterwards. He has two brothers who are also footballers: Lys and Maurice.  He is a dual citizen of Italy and Senegal. He is of Bissau-Guinean descent through his maternal family.

Club career

Early career
Gomis grew up in the Torino youth system, and on 3 July 2013, he was officially loaned to Calabrian club Crotone in Serie B. On 14 September, he made his debut against Spezia, which ended 1–0 for the Rossoblu. Despite his young age and lack of experience, Gomis played as a starter collected 39 appearances, plus one appearance in the playoffs, as well as one in Coppa Italia.

At the end of the season he was recalled by Torino, who decided to loan him again, but only after he was made available for the preliminaries of the Europa League as second choice goalkeeper, behind Daniele Padelli, against Brommapojkarna on 31 July 2014.

Loan to Avellino
On 11 August 2014, Alfred was officially loaned to Avellino in Serie B with a buyout clause, plus a buyback clause in favour of Torino. He made his official debut with the team on 17 August 2014, during the second round of Coppa Italia, which saw him maintain a clean sheet, the match ending 2–0 for Avellino. His league debut took place 30 August, during the first day of the championship against Pro Vercelli, finishing 1–0 in favour of Vercelli. On 28 October 2014, he parried a penalty kicked by Rodrigo Taddei in the final minutes of a match against Perugia, ending 0–0. He played 31 matches in the league and finished first in the Top 15 of the goalkeepers in Serie B according to a list compiled by the Lega Serie B.

Loan to Cesena
On 30 July 2015, he was loaned to newly relegated Serie B club Cesena with a buyout clause and a buy-back clause in favour of Torino.

Loans to Bologna and Salernitana
On 31 August 2016, he was loaned to Bologna as an emergency signing to replace Antonio Mirante, who was diagnosed with a heart problem. However, Gomis himself was injured soon after his arrival. He made his debut for Bologna in Coppa Italia against Verona. Gomis was dropped out again after the cup match, including the league and the round 16 of the cup. He was recalled by Torino, and on 18 January 2018 he was loaned to Salernitana in Serie B.

SPAL
On 8 July 2017, Gomis joined SPAL on loan with an obligation to buy at the end of the loan period. The permanent deal for undisclosed fee was announced on 20 June 2018.

Dijon
On 20 August 2019, Gomis joined Dijon FCO from SPAL for an undisclosed fee on a four-year-contract.

Rennes
On 29 September 2020, Gomis joined fellow Ligue 1 side Rennes on a five-year deal, replacing the outgoing Édouard Mendy.

Loan to Como
On 27 January 2023, Gomis returned to Italy and joined Como in Serie B for the rest of the season.

International career

Italy youth team
Gomis was called up to Italy under-20 in 2013 by Luigi Di Biagio, but did not make any appearances. He was summoned by Piscedda for another game against the Italy under-21 played at the Partenio in Avellino. A starter on this occasion, he remained on the field for 68 minutes without conceding a goal.

Senegal
Gomis was then called up by the Senegal national team, making his senior international debut on 14 November 2017, starting in a 2–1 victory against South Africa in the last qualifying match for the 2018 FIFA World Cup. In May 2018 he was named in Senegal's 23 man squad for the 2018 FIFA World Cup in Russia. He participated in the 2021 AFCON.

Career statistics

Club

International

Honours
Senegal
Africa Cup of Nations: 2021; runner-up: 2019

References

1993 births
Living people
People from Ziguinchor
Senegalese footballers
Association football goalkeepers
Senegal international footballers
2018 FIFA World Cup players
2019 Africa Cup of Nations players
2021 Africa Cup of Nations players
2022 FIFA World Cup players
Africa Cup of Nations-winning players
Senegalese people of Bissau-Guinean descent
Senegalese emigrants to Italy
Naturalised citizens of Italy
Italian footballers
Torino F.C. players
F.C. Crotone players
U.S. Avellino 1912 players
A.C. Cesena players
Bologna F.C. 1909 players
U.S. Salernitana 1919 players
S.P.A.L. players
Dijon FCO players
Stade Rennais F.C. players
Como 1907 players
Serie A players
Serie B players
Ligue 1 players
Italian people of Bissau-Guinean descent
Italian sportspeople of African descent
Senegalese expatriate footballers
Italian expatriate footballers
Senegalese expatriate sportspeople in France
Italian expatriate sportspeople in France
Expatriate footballers in France